Richard Wolff (born 19 October 1948) is a German wrestler. He competed in the men's Greco-Roman +100 kg at the 1976 Summer Olympics.

References

External links
 

1948 births
Living people
German male sport wrestlers
Olympic wrestlers of West Germany
Wrestlers at the 1976 Summer Olympics
People from Bad Reichenhall
Sportspeople from Upper Bavaria